Fourseam is an unincorporated community located in Perry County, Kentucky, United States.

The coal town was named by the Fourseam Coal Co. for the four coal seams exploited in the mine beginning shortly before World War I.

References

Unincorporated communities in Perry County, Kentucky
Unincorporated communities in Kentucky